Julio Martín Herrera Velutini (born December 15, 1971) is an international banker.

Early life and family 
Velutini was educated at The American School in England (UK), La Scuola Americana in Svizzera (Switzerland). and at the Central University of Venezuela (graduated in 1990). He has over 25 years of banking experience, and is part of a generation of bankers who were formed in the circle of the Caracas Stock Exchange at the Central Bank of Venezuela in the late 1980s and early 1990s.

The Herrera & Velutini family (Los Amos Del Valle de Caracas) have had a great influence on Venezuelan and Latin American banking & real estate since 1590 (founding Hacienda La Vega in 1590) and in the late 19th century with the founding of Banco Caracas in 1890. His great-grandfather Julio César Velutini Couturier chaired Banco Caracas until 1930. Later generations were all Chairman and senior managers of Banco Caracas for over 100 years until its sale in 1998.

Banking career
In the early 90s he started working at the Caracas Stock Exchange in Multinvest Casa de Bolsa (a brokerage firm), of which he was a member of the board until 1998. In that same year he became CEO at Inversiones Transbanca (holding that results from the sale of Banco Caracas), becoming one of its major shareholders and the senior director of companies such as Kia Motors of Venezuela,  BMW of Venezuela, BBO Financial Services, Transporte de Valores Bancarios de Venezuela (Securities Transport firm), Bolívar Banco Universal (becoming at the age of 29 the Chairman of the Board of Directors), Banco Activo Banco Comercial, and Banco Desarrollo del Microempresario.

In 2006, along with the board of directors of Inversiones Transbanca and his partners, Jose Herrera Velutini and Bélen Clarisa Velutini, Julio Herrera Velutini acquired companies such as Caracas Caja de Bolsa, IBG Trading, Banco Real and Banreal International Bank, recovering what once was the holding of the Velutini family.

From the beginning of 2007 until February 2009 he served as Chairman of the Board of Banco Real, and Banreal Holding, which was later sold in February 2009. That same year he purchased Banco Nacional de Crédito (BNC)

In late 2009 he founded Bancredito International Bank and Bancredito Foundation & Group in the U.S. In the beginning of 2012, he founded Britannia Financial Group in London and has acquired other financial institutions, such as Consultiva International Group. He also currently sits as a member of the board on several other corporations.

Bribery allegations 

On 4 August 2022, the US Department of Justice charged Herrera Velutini with bribery, in relation to the election campaign of former Governor of Puerto Rico Wanda Vázquez Garced. The Department of Justice alleges that Herrera Velutini sought to influence the Puerto Rico Office of the Commissioner of Financial Institutions (OCIF) audit of a bank he owns.

References 

Venezuelan bankers
Living people
1971 births